James P. Dunleavy (born 1939) is an American politician and jurist from Maine. Dunleavy, a Democrat, served one term in the Maine House of Representatives (1973-1974). He represented Presque Isle, Maine. After leaving the Legislature, Dunleavy was elected as Judge Probate for Aroostook County. Re-elected in 1980, he won the Democratic Party's nomination for Maine's 2nd congressional district in 1982. He lost to Republican incumbent Olympia Snowe.

Dunleavy is a graduate of the University of Maine School of Law, which he attended on scholarship. He is married and has seven children.

References

1938 births
Living people
People from Presque Isle, Maine
Maine lawyers
Probate court judges in the United States
Democratic Party members of the Maine House of Representatives
University of Maine School of Law alumni